Onchotelson is a genus of isopod crustaceans in the family Phreatoicidae, which is endemic to Tasmania. It contains two species, both of which are listed as vulnerable on the IUCN Red List:
Onchotelson brevicaudatus (Smith, 1909) 
Onchotelson spatulatus Nicholls, 1944

References

Isopod genera
Freshwater crustaceans of Australia
Invertebrates of Tasmania
Endemic fauna of Australia
Taxonomy articles created by Polbot